The 2015 Dutch TT was the eighth round of the 2015 Grand Prix motorcycle racing season. It was held at the TT Circuit Assen in Assen on 27 June 2015.

In the premier class, Valentino Rossi took his first pole position since the 2014 Valencian Grand Prix. In the race, Rossi fought hard with Marc Márquez; on the final lap, the two riders made contact at the final chicane, causing Rossi to go across the gravel trap. He was able to rejoin the track and claimed his third victory of the season, and a record seventh premier class victory at Assen. Rossi finished ahead of Márquez, while teammate Jorge Lorenzo completed the podium; Rossi extended his championship lead to 10 points as a result. Suzuki's Aleix Espargaró qualified second on the grid, but he dropped to ninth place in the race. Five riders retired from the race – Jack Miller collided with Héctor Barberá, while Stefan Bradl, Eugene Laverty and Alex de Angelis all crashed out.

Classification

MotoGP

Moto2
The first attempt to run the race was interrupted following an oil spill at the first turn caused by Luis Salom's crashed bike. For the restart, the race distance was reduced from 24 to 16 laps.

Moto3

Championship standings after the race (MotoGP)
Below are the standings for the top five riders and constructors after round eight has concluded.

Riders' Championship standings

Constructors' Championship standings

Teams' Championship standings

 Note: Only the top five positions are included for all standings.

References

Dutch
Tourist Trophy
Dutch TT
Dutch TT